The 2009–10 Edmonton Oilers season was the team's 38th season of play, its 31st as a member of the National Hockey League (NHL). The 2009–10 season was one of the poorest in franchise history as the Oilers finished last in the NHL. The team's 62 points was the second-lowest point total in franchise history and they missed the playoffs for the fourth straight season. After the regular season the Oilers won the 2010 NHL Draft lottery on April 13, 2010, and earned the first overall pick for the first time in franchise history.

Preseason 
On May 26, Pat Quinn was named as the new head coach of the Oilers, replacing Craig MacTavish. Tom Renney and Wayne Fleming were named associate coach and assistant coach, respectively.
On June 30, Oilers general manager Steve Tambellini aggressively pursued disgruntled winger and sniper Dany Heatley, who wanted a trade from the Ottawa Senators. A deal was in place that would have sent Andrew Cogliano, Dustin Penner and Ladislav Smid to Ottawa. However, Heatley who had a no-movement clause rejected the trade. Tambellini would eventually give up pursuing Heatley, and he was eventually traded to the San Jose Sharks.
On September 10, former Oiler Mike Comrie signed a one-year contract worth $1.125 million with the team that began his career. After a six-year hiatus, Comrie was finally able to mend the fences with the Oilers faithful. This was shown in a game against the Florida Panthers when Comrie dropped the gloves against Eric Himelfarb. After the fight, the fans showed appreciation by chanting his name. The Oilers won that game 4–0.

Regular season 

The Oilers allowed 278 goals (excluding 6 shootout goals), the most in the League.

Divisional standings

Conference standings

Schedule and results

Player statistics

Skaters

Goaltenders

†Denotes player spent time with another team before joining Oilers. Stats reflect time with Oilers only.
‡Traded mid-season. Stats reflect time with Oilers only.

Awards and records

Records 
7 seconds: A new Oilers record for fastest two goals in a game by Sheldon Souray (11:07) and Ales Hemsky (11:14) on November 23, 2009.

Milestones

Transactions 

The Oilers have been involved in the following transactions during the 2009–10 season.

Trades 

|}

Free agents acquired

Free agents lost

Claimed via waivers

Lost via waivers

Player signings

Draft picks 
Edmonton's picks at the 2009 NHL Entry Draft in Montreal, Quebec.

Farm teams 
 The Oilers are affiliated with the Springfield Falcons of the American Hockey League and the Stockton Thunder of the ECHL.

See also 
 2009–10 NHL season

References 

2009–10 in Canadian ice hockey by team
2009–10 NHL season by team
2009-10